Alphard Island or Meøya is an island  long and rising to , lying north of Shaula Island in the Øygarden Group. It was mapped by Norwegian cartographers from aerial photos taken by the Lars Christensen Expedition, 1936–37, and called "Meøya" ("Middle Island"). It was first visited by an Australian National Antarctic Research Expeditions party led by R. Dovers in 1954; the island was renamed by the Antarctic Names Committee of Australia after the star Alphard, which was used for an astrofix in the vicinity.

See also 
 List of Antarctic and sub-Antarctic islands
Cartography

References 

Islands of Kemp Land